''See also KFAN Sports Radio Network

KFSP (1230 AM) is a radio station licensed to Mankato, Minnesota and serving the greater Mankato area and the Minnesota River Valley with a sports format. The station is an affiliate of the regional KFAN Sports Radio Network and Fox Sports Radio. Founded in 1938 as KYSM, KFSP is the oldest radio station in Mankato.

The station is owned by Linder Radio Group. It was formerly owned by Clear Channel Communications, which sold its Mankato stations — KYSM, KYSM-FM, and KXLP — to Three Eagles Communications following Clear Channel's 2006 privatization. In September 2007, Three Eagles agreed to sell KYSM and KXLP to Linder Radio Group, a.k.a. Minnesota Valley Broadcasting Co. Linder currently owns KDOG, KTOE, KXAC, KATO-FM and KXLP in the Mankato market.

KYSM was a Top 40 station in the 1960s, full service MOR station during the 1970s and 1980s. The station aired a satellite-fed oldies format until 1995, when it flipped to a satellite-fed adult standards format.

References

External links
1230 The Fan official website
The Fan Radio Network

Radio stations in Minnesota
Sports radio stations in the United States
Mankato, Minnesota
Radio stations established in 1938
1938 establishments in Minnesota
Fox Sports Radio stations